"David Aghmashenebeli University of Georgia" – "DAUG"  was founded in 1991. The University offers the Bachelor's (four-year), Master's (two-years) and Doctoral (three-years) programmes according to the ECTS (European System of Credits and Transfers) which is based on the modern methods of teaching and evaluation. The University is a member of the European Business Assembly and has established the place among the best universities in Georgia.

David Aghmashenebeli University of Georgia is a partner with the universities as the United Kingdom, Germany and so on.

References

Educational institutions established in 1991
Universities in Georgia (country)
Education in Tbilisi
Buildings and structures in Tbilisi
1991 establishments in Georgia (country)
Vake, Tbilisi